Edward L. Ilou (1905–1978) was a Swedish-born art director who designed the sets of a number of Hollywood films and television episodes. Much of his early work was for Eagle-Lion Films. He was art director on a number film noirs including  Raw Deal (1948) and He Walked by Night (1948).  He is sometimes credited simply as Edward Ilou.

Selected filmography
 Assigned to Danger (1948)
 Raw Deal (1948)
 Hollow Triumph  (1948)
The Noose Hangs High (1948)
 The Man from Texas (1948)
 Mickey (1948)
 Northwest Stampede (1948)
 The Iroquois Trail (1950)
 Under the Gun (1951)
 Kansas City Confidential (1952)
 China Venture (1953)
 El Alamein (1953)
 Carmen Jones (1954)
 The Black Dakotas (1954)
 Ten Wanted Men (1955)
 The Boy and the Pirates (1960)
 The Wicked Dreams of Paula Schultz (1968)

References

Bibliography
 Alvarez, Max. The Crime Films of Anthony Mann. University Press of Mississippi, 2014.
 Dickos, Andrew. Street with No Name: A History of the Classic American Film Noir. University Press of Kentucky,  2002.

External links

1905 births
1978 deaths
Swedish art directors
American art directors
People from Stockholm
Swedish emigrants to the United States